Prepotelus is a genus of Mauritian crab spiders first described by Eugène Simon in 1898.

Species
 it contains four species:
Prepotelus curtus Ledoux, 2004 — Réunion
Prepotelus lanceolatus Simon, 1898 — Mauritius, Réunion
Prepotelus limbatus (Simon, 1898) — Mauritius
Prepotelus pectinitarsis (Simon, 1898) — Mauritius

References

External links

Araneomorphae genera
Thomisidae